AD 68 (LXVIII) was a leap year starting on Friday (link will display the full calendar) of the Julian calendar. At the time, it was known as the Year of the Consulship of Silius Italicus and Trachalus, or the start of the Year of the Four Emperors (or, less frequently, year 821 Ab urbe condita). The denomination AD 68 for this year has been used since the early medieval period, when the Anno Domini calendar era became the prevalent method in Europe for naming years. These are now used throughout the world.

Events

By place

Roman Empire 
Final year that Tacitus records Annals, a written history of the Roman Empire.
Lucius Clodius Macer revolts against the reign of Nero.
The Senate declares Nero as persona non grata.
June 9 – Emperor Nero commits suicide four miles outside Rome. He is deserted by the Praetorian Guard, and then stabs himself in the throat.
June 9 – The Roman Senate accepts Servius Sulpicius Galba, as Roman Emperor.
Legio I Macriana liberatrix and Legio I Adiutrix are created.
Marcus Ulpius Trajanus, father of Trajan, becomes consul.
Trajan moves to Scythopolis and crosses the Jordan River with Legio X Fretensis. He lays siege to Jericho and destroys the monastery of Qumran, where the Dead Sea Scrolls are originated.
Winter – Titus sets up camp at Jericho and the Romans cut off escape routes toward Jerusalem.
Venutius successfully deposes his wife Cartimandua and becomes the ruler of the Brigantes.

Asia 
 Kingdom of Funan is established in the Mekong Delta comprising present-day Cambodia, Southern Vietnam, Southern Thailand and Eastern Thailand, the first known civilization in Southeast Asia. The capital city is Vyadhapura or modern-day Ba Phnum District in Cambodia.

By topic

Religion 
 Buddhism officially arrives in China with the building of the White Horse Temple.
 Ignatius of Antioch becomes the third bishop of Antioch.
 The Gospel of Mark is written; and latest date for Second Epistle of Peter if of Petrine composition (approximate date).
 The Essenes place the Dead Sea Scrolls in the caves at Qumran.
<onlyinclude>

Births 
 July 4 – Salonia Matidia, niece of Trajan (d. AD 119)
 Flavius Scorpus, Roman charioteer (approximate date)
 Gaius Bruttius Praesens, Roman consul (d. AD 140)

Deaths 
 April 25 – Mark the Evangelist, pope of Alexandria
 June 9 – Nero, Roman emperor (suicide) (b. AD 37)
 Ananus ben Ananus, Jewish high priest of Israel
 Basilissa and Anastasia, Christian martyrs (beheaded)
 Gaius Julius Vindex, Roman governor (suicide)
 Lucius Clodius Macer, Roman general (murdered)
 Nymphidius Sabinus, Roman praetorian prefect
 Onesimus, bishop of Byzantium (approximate date)
 Publius Petronius Turpilianus, Roman consul (suicide)
 Tiberius Julius Mithridates, Roman client king

References 

0068

als:60er#68